Paskovac is a village in the municipality of Loznica, Serbia. According to the 2002 census, the village has a population of 687 people.

Paskovac's population in 2011 consisted of 47% women and 53 % males whose ages ranged from 17- 65 and above.

References

Populated places in Mačva District